Beyond the Stellar Empire (or BSE) is a play-by-email (PBM) game. Originally published by Adventures By Mail, BSE was an open-ended "space opera" with a single available game that began in playtesting in 1981. According to Stephen Marte, during the mid-1980s, like "Tribes of Crane and Midgard, BSE [was] the stomping ground of many of PBM's best power gamers". The game had two variants, one monitored by Game Masters who imposed artificial constraints, and another without constraints. Gameplay took place on a vast space stage where mega-corporations formed the dominant organizing framework, alongside various other groups that players could join to pursue tasks to advance, collaborate with other players, and progress to more senior positions such as space colony governors. Beyond the Stellar Empire placed #5 and #11 for Best PBM Game of the Year in 1987 and 1988, respectively, in Paper Mayhem, a magazine for play-by-mail games. In subsequent years, the game did not score well in Paper Mayhem reader ratings for playability, use, and product understanding. Beyond the Stellar Empire: The New System won the Origins Award for Best New Play-By-Mail Game of 1989.

The original game as run by Adventures by Mail in the United States was discontinued in the late 1990s. In the United Kingdom, a separate PBM game of Beyond the Stellar Empire ran until 2002 when the entire game was upgraded to a 21st-century version, Phoenix: Beyond the Stellar Empire (see KJC Games below). While still a PBM game, Phoenix enables players to input orders via web browser while receiving email turn results.

Development
In the Spring 1985 issue of Flagship, John Muir stated that the game had been operating for three years, putting its initial publication at 1982. In the January 1983 issue of The Space Gamer, Adventures By Mail stated that they had processed more than 20,000 turns of BSE. Muir stated that, in 1985, BSE was human moderated with computer assistance. This continued to 1990.

Reviewer Stephen Marte stated in 1987 that he had contact information for 150 PBM players but speculated that as many as 450 actually played the game.

In the January/February 1990 issue of Paper Mayhem, a magazine for play-by-mail games, Mike Popolizio, Liz Leblanc, and Marti Popolizio described a redesign conducted on BSE. The overhaul included faster turnaround times for turns, additional options for diplomacy, increased ability to implement player suggestions, introduction of black-markets, and other changes. 

In a 1992 issue of Paper Mayhem, Wayne Alexander identified two variants of Beyond the Stellar Empire: the Capellan Periphery and the Draconian Variant. Alexander noted that the Capellan Periphery was the initial variant and was open-ended in the sense that it had no victory conditions–players could continue to progress through work and expenditures, requesting and completing assignments, acquiring larger ships and colonies, etc. However, he lamented that the Capellan Periphery was not truly open-ended in that the Game Masters (GMs) eventually would impose an artificial constraint on play that he called "The Wall". This didn't prevent the players from having an enjoyable playing experience, but it limited "power players". In other words, according to Alexander, "The Capellan Periphery has a lot of sizzle, but the steak is just dog meat." The Draconian Variant, while nascent in 1992, and saddled with some minor gameplay challenges, put players on the "ground floor" of a truly open-ended game, causing Alexander to describe it as one "with very little sizzle at this point, but the steak is filet mignon in potential".

Gameplay

Game mechanics

Players controlled "positions" in the game which were identified by four-digit numbers for turn processing and interaction, and were tied to a specific player who owned them. The numbering meant that a maximum of 9999 positions could exist in the game at any given time, including GM-run positions such as neutral starbases.

A position could be one of four types:
A starship was the most important type of position. Each starship belonged to a specific class which was defined primarily through the number of Command, Main, and Engine Hulls it had. Hulls determined the number (mass) of items that could be installed in the respective section or carried as cargo. For example, only Command Hulls could have items like life support, sensors or targeting computers installed, and housed the crew; only Engine Hulls could have thrust engines and jump engines installed; and Main Hulls would be used to install most other equipment and store passengers and cargo. Some items, like shield generators, could be installed in any section, as the sections could be targeted individually in combat. In this fashion, it was easily possible to customize a given ship. Ships could also be upgraded (or downgraded) to another class at colonies with suitable shipyards, gaining or losing hulls. Beyond a number of generic classes, affiliations could create their own advanced ship designs on which they would then have a monopoly. Players would begin with a Surveyor-class vessel that had 6 Command, 12 Main and 6 Engine hulls. If a player wanted to run additional ships, these would usually be spawned as Yachts configured 3-4-5. For comparison, the Supra Freighter, the largest generic ship class available to all players through neutral GM-run colonies, was configured 4-45-10 and was prohibited from firing weapons (though it could launch fighters). More advanced ships grew progressively bigger, up to several hundred total hulls and sometimes with special abilities or quirks.
A ground party could be formed from any combination of items and personnel in one spot on the ground or in space, ranging from mere equipment stashes to exploration teams, to huge ground assault armies. They could be moved as a single cargo item aboard starships if enough cargo space was available for the entire ground party, and most ground parties were surface mobile (if they had enough cargo vehicles to carry any immobile equipment) or even capable of dropping onto a planetary surface from orbit.
A colony was a fixed ground installation consisting of various buildings called "complexes" organized into civilian, naval, and military quarters roughly similar to starships. While inherently immobile, they could mine resources, research, and produce items. A subtype were Outposts which typically consisted only of automated mines. Outposts were not considered positions themselves, although they were identified with a number; instead, they were either tied to a starship, ground party, or colony position that owned them and received status updates on their printouts, or were unowned and did not report to anyone. Since they were no proper playing positions, they cost no money to run but also had very limited options. Colonies could be turned into outposts (and vice versa) which would shut down most activity at a colony, save for mining.
A political position had no in-game representation and only very limited means of interacting with other positions, mostly in the form of transferring in-game currency. Political positions were reserved for the most senior players such as affiliation leaders, to be used for administrative purposes.

Each position type had their own set of possible orders or actions, with a specific syntax. Players would send in filled-out turn cards with orders covering one or two weeks (70 or 140 "Time Units", TUs); each action for ships and ground parties required a specific amount of TUs, limiting the number of possible actions. Colonies and political positions were not limited by TUs but rather by number of orders issued. Orders as written on the turn cards were entered manually, and processed one turn card at a time. Players paid money to have their turn cards processed. Inactive positions thus cost no money to run, but ships could be lost to overdue maintenance or crew mutiny; colonies meanwhile would auto-generate a turn every four weeks at the latest even when no orders were submitted.

All positions could use "Special Actions" (at extra cost), a free-text action directed at the GM who would provide a hand-moderated result. This allowed for roleplaying and interaction with Non-player characters or phenomena found during exploration, beyond the scope of the actions pre-defined through the ruleset.

Affiliations
Although every positions was played individually, players were expected to band together in so-called Affiliations. These were identified by a three-letter prefix to the name of all their positions. Initially, most affiliations available to players were a range of competing mega-corporations including FET (Frontier Exploration & Trade), GTT (Galactic Trade & Transport), and SMS (Stellar Mining & Smelting), under the overall aegis of the human empire, IMP (Imperial Forces). Affiliations had appropriate special abilities, such as superior exploration (and smuggling) abilities for the FET, increased production at colonies for the GTT, increased output from mines for the SMS, or improved combat capabilities for the IMP. Other human and non-human affiliations, some player-driven, some as friendly or even antagonistic NPCs, were added in over time as the game and its storylines evolved. New players were classed TRN (Trainee) for a while, and players who did not wish to join an affiliation had the option of staying IND (Independent), though this usually resulted in being mistrusted by everybody. Affiliation was tied to a given player, not an individual position, and thus applied to all positions run by a given player. (An exception were derelicted starships which were classed DER on an individual basis, and could not process orders until they were crewed again.)

Diplomacy played a part in gameplay. A player in 1987 stated that he received an average of 47 letters weekly while playing.

Setting
The game took place on a vast space stage. Stephen Marte stated the following about the field of play in 1987: The playing field consists of 80 systems. Each system is 30X30 hexes and each hex is 46,000 square miles. Five hundred planets, moons, and gas giants have been found in the 52 systems of the Capellan Periphery and it is estimated there are another 500 worlds in the 38 systems of the less explored Transhole Region. Planets and moons may be mapped, scanned, and geologically proved down to a 10 square mile sector. For all intents and purposes the scope of the playing field is as large as your imagination.

The central element of the game was its thirteen mega-corporations. Most of these were directed by a Game Master employed by Adventures by Mail, but run by a board of coordinators made up of players which managed a large hierarchy of players. These corporations provided frameworks that enabled players to choose, pursue, and accomplish tasks, but also generated interesting competition dynamics between corporations as well as internal competition struggles that sometimes caused cleavages serious enough to cause banishments or voluntary departures. Players did not have to join a mega-corporation: other possible groups included "seven alien races, a religious sect, and a small piratical band know[n] as the Raiders of the Imperial Periphery (RIP)".

Players were limited to two starcaptains at the outset, but had significant variety among the 16 ship types and great room for game progression. For example, by 1987, there were 250 players acting as space colony governors of varying sizes. Powerful players in mature roles could shift to a research focus to keep gameplay from getting stale.

Reception and legacy
Adventures by Mail stated in 1984 that BSE was the only PBM game selected by Games Magazine in its list of top 100 games of 1983. Reviewer Stephen Marte observed in 1987 that Beyond the Stellar Empire was in some ways "the "ultimate PBM game". In the November/December 1987 issue of Paper Mayhem, Beyond the Stellar Empire tied for the #5 spot on the list of Best PBM Games of 1987 with Beyond the Quadra Zone. In 1988, the game tied for 11th place in the list of Best PBM Games of 1988 along with Rimworlds. However, the game did not perform well in reader ratings in Paper Mayhem during the following years. In the May/June 1989 issue, the game scored 43 of 44 rated games. In the July/August 1990 issue, it placed #63 of #68. In July/August 1993 it was #81 of #81. And in Nov/Dec 1994 it again placed last at #72 of #72.

Beyond the Stellar Empire: The New System was awarded the Origins Award for "Best New Play-by-Mail Game of 1989".

The original Beyond the Stellar Empire by Adventures by Mail was discontinued at some point around the year 2000.

KJC Games

Kevin J. Cropper of UK-based KJC Games obtained a license to Beyond the Stellar Empire and launched a second incarnation of the game in June of 1992, colloquially known as UK-BSE. (KJC Games had previously licensed other games such as It's a Crime from Adventures by Mail already.) Mica Goldstone was soon hired as GM and line developer for Beyond the Stellar Empire, and would eventually take over the company from Kevin Cropper. UK-BSE ran independently from Adventure by Mail's, having started with a brand-new universe and some rule changes; accordingly, its in-game history played out differently.

KJC Games gradually moved away from paper-based gaming, first accepting turn cards via email and since 1998 also returning results via email. The game eventually outgrew its technical limitations; by the late 1990s KJC Games determined that the underlying program essentially needed to be rewritten. In particular, when a space battle occurred the participating positions had to be manually ported into a separate combat program, and several very large battles exceeded that program's processing capabilities.

After a prolonged period of consulting with players, the game was rewritten from the ground up, with substantial changes to the game mechanics and a different payment model. The new, email-based game was named Phoenix: Beyond the Stellar Empire, or simply Phoenix. The gaming universe and accumulated game history from KJC's Beyond the Stellar Empire was kept, however, and all positions were transferred into the new game in late 2002, with ship configurations, system maps, etc. adjusted for the new ruleset.

Phoenix is still active today.

See also
 List of play-by-mail games

References

Bibliography

 
 . Magazine date: December—January 2003/2004.
 
 
  Describes updating of BSE into Phoenix: BSE.
 
 
 
 
 
 
 
 
 
 
 
 
 
 
 
 
 
 
  Describes first impressions after updating BSE into Phoenix: BSE.

Further reading

External links
 Official website.

Origins Award winners
Play-by-mail games